Muscleman may denote any man with well-developed muscles, in particular a bodybuilder. In art-related and anatomical contexts, the term is also used for a model in wax (or, in modern times, of unbreakable plastic material) showing the muscles of a man. Such a figure showing the muscles of the human body without skin is also called écorché.

In popular culture
Muscleman is the translated title of Japanese manga series Kinnikuman. M.U.S.C.L.E. was a line of related collectible toy figures produced in the U.S. from 1985-1988.

Notes

Bodybuilding
Visual arts